Oroxylin A is an O-methylated flavone, a chemical compound that can be found in the medicinal plants Scutellaria baicalensis and Scutellaria lateriflora, and the Oroxylum indicum tree. It has demonstrated activity as a dopamine reuptake inhibitor, and is also a negative allosteric modulator of the benzodiazepine site of the GABAA receptor. Oroxylin A has been found to improve memory consolidation in mice by elevating brain-derived neurotrophic factor (BDNF) levels in the hippocampus.

See also
 Baicalin
 Baicalein
 Chaenomeles speciosa

References

O-methylated flavones
Resorcinols
Dopamine reuptake inhibitors
GABAA receptor negative allosteric modulators
Nootropics